Teresia Mbaika Malokwe (née Teresia Mbaika), is currently the nominated principal secretary of State Department for Devolution assigned in the office of H.E. Geoffrey Rigathi Gachagua the deputy president of the Republic of Kenya.        .Teresia is also an environmentalist and health economist. She also serves as the Secretary of the "National Government-Constituency Development Fund" (NG-CDF) for Kaiti Constituency, in Makueni County, in the former Eastern Province of Kenya.

Early life and education

After attending local primary and secondary schools, she was admitted to Kenyatta University, a public university, whose main campus is in Nairobi County, where she graduated with a Bachelor of Science degree in Environmental Health, in 2011. She followed that with a Master of Science degree in Health Economics, obtained from the University of Nairobi, in 2014. Later in 2016, she received training leading to the award of a certificate in "Comprehensive Introduction to Nuclear Power", at Texas A&M University, in College Station, Texas, United States.

Career
She has worked at the Kaiti Constituency NG-CDF since June 2013. Her duties there, include overseeing financial management, corporate governance and compliance at the government agency.

Other considerations
Ms Teresia Mbaika Malokwe is a member of the eleven-person board of directors at the Kenya Nuclear Electricity Board. While there, she chairs the Finance and General Purpose committee.

Since January 2014, she serves as a board member at Beams Construction & Supplies Limited, a Nairobi-based construction company.

In June 2018, the president of Kenya, Uhuru Kenyatta appointed Teresia Mbaika Malokwe to the board of directors at the National Environment Management Authority of Kenya, for a three-year renewable term.

Ms Teresia Mbaika Malokwe (Terry), serves as the Deputy Director for Youth and Gender Affairs at Ukamba Network Vamwe (UNV), a community development non-profit that aims to unite Ukambani communities, in an attempt to improve their standard of living.

References

External links
List of Members of Board of Directors at National Environment Management Authority of Kenya

Living people
1986 births
Kenyan scientists
Kamba people
Kenyan environmentalists
Kenyan women environmentalists
21st-century Kenyan women
Kenyatta University alumni
University of Nairobi alumni
People from Makueni County